Edgardo Zachrisson (born 5 May 1950) is a Guatemalan former sports shooter. He competed at the 1976 Summer Olympics.

References

1950 births
Living people
Guatemalan male sport shooters
Olympic shooters of Guatemala
Shooters at the 1976 Summer Olympics